Zahirul Haque Bhuiyan Mohan is a Bangladesh Awami League politician and the incumbent Member of Parliament of Narsingdi-3.

Early life
Mohan was born 30 December 1956 and has a Bachelor of Arts degree.

Career
Mohan was elected to parliament from Narsingdi-3 as a Bangladesh Awami League candidate 30 December 2018.

References

Awami League politicians
Living people
11th Jatiya Sangsad members
Year of birth missing (living people)